The North Sea–Mediterranean Corridor (also known as Dublin–Brussel Corridor) is the number 8 of the ten priority axes of the Trans-European Transport Network. It stretches from Ireland and the north of UK through the Netherlands, Belgium and Luxembourg to the Mediterranean Sea in the south of France.

History
According to the European Union:
This multimodal corridor, comprising inland waterways in Benelux and France, aims not only at offering better multimodal services between the North Sea ports, the Maas, Rhine, Scheldt, Seine, Saone and Rhone river basins and the ports of Fos-sur-Mer and Marseille, but also at better interconnecting the British Isles with continental Europe.

References

External links
 Trans-European Transport Network (TEN-T) at European Union official web site

Transport and the European Union
TEN-T Core Network Corridors